The A16 motorway is a motorway in the Netherlands. It runs from the interchange Terbregseplein in the northeastern part of Rotterdam, towards the Belgian border near Hazeldonk. The motorway has 19 exits including 7 interchanges.

Speed limit 

Nearly the entire A16 motorway, including both the local and express lanes near Rotterdam, featured a maximum speed of 100 km/h. The only exception to this were two short sections: between Dordrecht and Klaverpolder as well as the section between the intersection Princeville, west of Breda and the Belgian border, where a speed of 120 km/h is allowed.
At the section between the Moerdijk bridges and the Belgian border the maximum speed changed to 130 km/h as of 2011.

Local–express lanes near Rotterdam 

Near Rotterdam, a system of collector–express lanes is used. The exits 24 through 26 are only accessible through the outer (collector) lanes. The inner lanes serve as express lanes and do not have any exits.

In the northern direction, there are three express lanes of which one lane is reserved for buses and trucks, while on the southbound express lanes three regular lanes are available, of which none is reserved for special vehicles.

Shared road sections 

On two sections of the road, other Dutch motorways run along the north–south motorway A16. Between interchanges Klaverpolder and Zonzeel, the east–west A59 motorway follows the route of the A16 for about 8 kilometers. Further south, between interchanges Princeville and Galder, the same goes for the (also east–west) A58 motorway, for a distance of about 6 kilometers.

Besides, European route E19 (Amsterdam–Paris) follows the complete route of the A16 motorway between the Terbregseplein in Rotterdam and the Belgian border near Breda.

Exit list

External links

Motorways in the Netherlands
Motorways in North Brabant
Motorways in South Holland
Transport in Breda
Transport in Dordrecht
Transport in Moerdijk
Transport in Rotterdam
Hendrik-Ido-Ambacht
Ridderkerk
Zwijndrecht, Netherlands